

The Alenia ITV is a technology demonstrator aircraft developed in Italy in the early 21st century. In the spring of 2003, Alenia Aeronautica of Italy unveiled a non-flying ground-test prototype of a half-scale unmanned combat aerial vehicle demonstrator, known as an "Integration Technology Vehicle (ITV)", with a flight prototype to follow. The ITV has a high-mounted wing with a sweep of 35 degrees; a vee tail; a Microturbo TRI60-5 turbojet, with 4.4 kN (450 kgp / 990 lbf) thrust, mounted on the back behind the wing; retractable tricycle landing gear; and metal construction.

As the ITV designation suggests, this machine is strictly for technology development and risk reduction. A "real" Alenia Aeronautica UCAV will be at least twice as big, use a tailless delta configuration, and will be made mostly of composite materials. It will have a modular payload bay for carriage of smart weapons, SAR, or day-night EO sensors. Alenia Spazio, a sister organization in the Finnmeccia Group, will provide a satellite data link. Meteor is also part of the Finnmeccia group and there is likely some collaboration between Meteor and Alenia Aeronautica on UAV design.

Specifications

References
This article contains material that originally came from the web article Unmanned Aerial Vehicles by Greg Goebel, which exists in the Public Domain.

Unmanned aerial vehicles of Italy
ITV
Abandoned civil aircraft projects